The following lists events have happened in 2015 in the Italian Republic.

Incumbents
 President: Giorgio Napolitano (until 14 January), Sergio Mattarella (starting 3 February)
 Prime Minister: Matteo Renzi

Events

January 
 January 14 – President of Italy Giorgio Napolitano announces his resignation.

March 
March 3 – South of Sicily, Italy's Coast Guard saves 941 trafficked migrants aboard five motorized dinghies and two larger vessels near southern Italian ports. Ten people are unaccounted for.

April 
 April 18 – shipwreck in the Sicilian channel of a boat loaded with 887 migrants off the Libyan coast, accidentally impacted with the King Jacob ship.  Over 800 deaths, the highest number of victims ever recorded.

May
 May 1 – October 31 – Expo 2015 is held in Milan, Italy.

July
 July 11 – Bombing of the Italian Consulate in Cairo.

December 
 December  – Lombardy Bans the Burka.

Deaths
January 4 – Pino Daniele, 59, singer
January 10 – Francesco Rosi, 92, director
February 14 – Michele Ferrero, 89, entrepreneur and owner of the chocolate manufacturer Ferrero SpA
April 5 – Francesco Smalto, 87, fashion designer
April 6 – Giovanni Berlinguer, 90, politician, MEP (2004–09)
April 14 – Roberto Tucci, 93, Roman Catholic prelate, President of Vatican Radio (1985–2001), Cardinal-Priest of  S. Ignazio di Loyola a Campo Marzio since 2001
April 17 – Renato Altissimo, 74, politician 
April 19 – Elio Toaff, 99, rabbi, Chief Rabbi of Rome (1951–2002)
May 15 – Renzo Zorzi, 68, racing driver
May 21 – Annarita Sidoti, 44, race walker, 1997 World Champion 
June 12 – Micol Fontana , 101, fashion designer
July 14 – Willer Bordon, 66, politician
July 20 – Elio Fiorucci, 80, fashion designer
September 17 – Valeria Cappellotto, 45, racing cyclist.
September 27 – Pietro Ingrao, 100, politician, President of the Chamber of Deputies (1976–79)
November 15 – Moira Orfei, 82, actress and owner of Circus Orfei
November 16 – Nando Gazzolo, 87, actor and voice actor
November 27 – Luca De Filippo, 67, director, son of Eduardo
December 6 – Mariuccia Mandelli , 90, fashion designer, founder of Krizia fashion house 
December 14 – Armando Cossutta, 89, politician
December 15 – Licio Gelli, 96, financer and Venerable Master of the clandestine lodge Propaganda Due (P2)

See also
 2015 in Italian television
 List of Italian films of 2015

References 

 
2010s in Italy
Years of the 21st century in Italy
Italy
Italy